Zalon Thompson (born 1 December 1983) is a British Soul singer, songwriter and record producer Tipped as the new face of Soul, Zalon has garnered an international fanbase, selling out concerts around the world with his sultry soulful voice and his dynamic live shows. 

He established a name for himself on the live music scene in London, where Patrick Allen asked him to sing at the weekly celebrity haunt 10 rooms. Each week when huge artists such as Will Smith, Pharrel, Joss Stone, Amy Winehouse, Black Eye Peas, etc during their promo in London they would often stop by 10 Rooms live music spot and perform with the house band. Zalon often sang dueted with the biggest stars on the planet, which quickly made him the industry's 'one to watch.'

It was here that Zalon met Amy Winehouse and formed a strong relationship. Amy Winehouse instantly became a fan of Zalon and she would go to 10 rooms just to hear him sing.

Dale Davis, Amy Winehouse's Musical director called Zalon to go on tour for her upcoming album Back to black but Zalon declined as he wanted to focus on his own album. Amy Winehouse determined to have Zalon tour with her called him up personally and he agreed to join her. 

The tour was initially planned for 6 months but due to the huge international success of her record Back To Black, the tour continue for nearly 6 years. Zalon became the lead featured vocalist in her band, and contributed to her 50x platinum success, featuring on her Grammy Award-winning album (Back to Black Deluxe), I Told You I Was Trouble DVD and the songs "Hey Little Rich Girl" and "You’re Wondering Now".

Amy Winehouse was passionate about Zalon being introduced to the world so she signed him to her label Lioness. To introduce Zalon to her fanbase Amy Winehouse would often give Zalon solos in her songs shouting "CHECK OUT ZALONONLINE.COM" to the audience after he sang. Zalon became popular amongst the fans and he grew a strong following for himself.

Zalon was then asked to perform his own music "The Click" and "What's A Man To Do" (which were co-produced by Zalon, Mark Ronson and Dale Davis) in the middle of Amy Winehouse's world tour. Which was the start of his solo career.

Just before they could release Zalon's album, Amy Winehouse died 23 July 2011, and the album was put on hold.

Over a year later on September 2012 Zalon released "You Let Me Breathe"; an emotional tribute to the late Amy Winehouse. The single received rave reviews from critics, press internationally and millions of views online.

Zalon later went on to vocal produce on her posthumous album "Lioness: Hidden Treasures" in Miami with multi-platinum super producer Salaam Remi and his brother Heshima Thompson.

After losing Amy, Zalon continued to work on his album 'Liquid Sonic Sex' volume 1 that they had started together when she signed him. In between recording sessions, Zalon’s time was spent caring for his sister Anika Simone Gay and her 3 young sons during her battle with cancer. Sadly Anika passed away in March 2013. As part of the healing process Zalon was inspired to begin a tour in memory of Anika, titling the tour ‘This One’s For You’ in 2016 in Brazil.

Since 2013, Zalon has toured the world, headlined festivals and sold out concerts worldwide.

In 2016 Zalon launched his own Soul festival called 'The Soul Royalty Winter Festival', tipped as the number 1 Soul festival in central London. The festival raises awareness and collects money for the homeless at Christmas whilst live-streaming the festival around the world. Since its inception 'The Soul Royalty Winter Festival'  has since reached millions online.

On 6 June 2022 Zalon announced a residency at DREAM Dubai. In July 2022 Zalon alluded to a new album in the works, rumoured to be released in 2023 and followed by a world tour.

Influences 
Zalon has named Marvin Gaye as his idol and biggest influence. He said that he wanted to be the modern Marvin Gaye and praised his ability to create timeless music that transcends generations. He noted, "I think Marvin was a great inspiration for me, especially as he spoke about all aspects of love, making it, falling and losing in love. I also loved that he was a social commentator speaking on important issues".

Early life
Born at Park Royal Hospital in London, Zalon Thompson, son of reggae singer Dr Alimantado and brother of fellow backing vocalist Heshima. Zalon attended Furness Primary School and then went to Hampstead School in Cricklewood to advance his education.

Zalon Thompson went to Hammersmith and West London College and studied Popular Music which covered all bases of the music industry and learned to play drums and guitar.

Career
Zalon and his brother Heshima, then aged 20 and 16, began touring the UK live circuit with the American soul singer Freddie Lee as part of his production shows in 2003.  A few years later, promoter and singer Patrick Alan approached Zalon to sing backing vocals and duets with his guests at his regular Monday night spot at the 10 Rooms, and through this Zalon met Amy Winehouse.

Amy asked Zalon to tour with her for her Back to Black album which was only scheduled to last for 6 months, but the tour was so successful they ended up touring for a further six years and collected five Grammy Awards.  Zalon went on to feature on the deluxe version of the platinum-selling album, and I Told You I Was Trouble DVD, with the songs "Hey Little Rich Girl", "Monkey Man" and "You're Wondering Now". He also sang backing vocals on Winehouse's track "He Can Only Hold Her" which appeared on Back to Black and the BBC Radio One session, "Cupid".

Zalon performs Marvin Gaye and Tammi Terrell's hit "Ain't No Mountain High Enough" with Dionne Bromfield on her debut album.

Zalon released his Ep titled 'You Let Me Breathe' in 2016 and his debut album 'Liquid Sonic Sex' in 2017
He has headlined festivals, performed at many private events for celebrities, top companies, and has sold out shows around the world.

Television appearances
 10 October 2009: Strictly Come Dancing (BBC One)
 28 October 2009: This Morning (ITV1)

Soul Royalty
Zalon created his own soul festival ‘The Soul Royalty Festival’ as he felt soul music was under-represented worldwide. The last festival live stream reached over 300,000 people and was watched by 84,000 people. Soul Royalty Winter Festival is in its fifth year, bringing emerging and upcoming soul and reggae artists in front of an international audience while also raising money and awareness for, The Connection at St Martin's – a homeless charity in London.

Discography

Albums
 Amy Winehouse
 2006: Back to Black
Zalon
2017: Liquid Sonic Sex Vol 1

Singles
 Dionne Bromfield
 2009: "Ain't No Mountain High Enough"

Awards

Grammy Awards

References

Living people
English male singers
Singers from London
1983 births
21st-century English singers
21st-century British male singers